Zhang Zhongliang (Chinese: 张仲良; 1907–1983) was a member of the Chinese Communist Party (CCP). He was born in Yao County, Shaanxi Province where he joined the Communist Party in February 1931. He was the secretary of the CCP Qinghai committee, and later became the first secretary of the CCP Gansu committee, chairman of the Gansu CPPCC and political commissar of the Gansu military region. He was removed from these posts in 1962.  Zhang died in February 1983.

References

1907 births
1983 deaths
People's Republic of China politicians from Shaanxi
Chinese Communist Party politicians from Shaanxi
Politicians from Tongchuan
Victims of the Cultural Revolution
Political office-holders in Gansu
Political office-holders in Qinghai